Tim Gilissen (born 4 June 1982) is a Dutch former professional footballer who played as a midfielder. During his career his played for Heracles Almelo, Go Ahead Eagles and NAC Breda.

Honours
Heracles Almelo
 Eerste Divisie: 2004–05

References

External links
 Voetbal International profile 
 

1982 births
Living people
Dutch footballers
NAC Breda players
Heracles Almelo players
Go Ahead Eagles players
Eredivisie players
Eerste Divisie players
Footballers from Enschede
Association football midfielders